Carnival of Crime (Spanish: Carnaval del crimen) is a 1962 mystery film directed by George Cahan and starring Jean-Pierre Aumont, Alix Talton and Tônia Carrero. It is based on the 1956 novel The Sleeping Partner by British writer Winston Graham. The film was a co-production between several countries and was shot in Brazil.

Cast
 Jean-Pierre Aumont as Mike Voray 
 Alix Talton as Lynn Voray 
 Tônia Carrero as Marina Silvera 
 Luis Dávila as Ray Donato 
 Alberto Dalbés as Photographer 
 Nathán Pinzón as Inspector 
 Jardel Filho as Paulo 
 Norma Bengell as Model 
 Norma Blum as Secretary 
 Alicia Bonet as Prostitute 
 Laura Suarez as Mrs Silvera
 Paulo Monte
 João Goulart
 Agildo Ribeiro
 Francisco Dantas
 Sadi Cabral
 Noelia Noel
 Luiz Bonfá
 Billy Davis
 Oscar Uboldi
 Ángel Zavalia

References

Bibliography
 Goble, Alan. The Complete Index to Literary Sources in Film. Walter de Gruyter, 1999.

External links 
 

1962 films
1960s mystery films
American mystery films
1960s English-language films
1960s Spanish-language films
Spanish mystery films
Argentine mystery films
Brazilian mystery films
Films shot in Brazil
Films based on British novels
Crown International Pictures films
1960s American films